Sergiu Ioan Viorel Costin (born 21 November 1978) is a Romanian former football player who played as a defender for teams such as Gloria Bistrița, Unirea Dej. Olimpia Satu Mare, Oțelul Galați or Someșul Dej, among others.

Honours

Oțelul Galați
Liga I: 2010–11
Supercupa României: 2011

References

External links
  
 
 

1978 births
Living people
Sportspeople from Bistrița
Romanian footballers
Association football defenders
Liga I players
Liga II players
Liga III players
ACF Gloria Bistrița players
FC Unirea Dej players
FC Olimpia Satu Mare players
ASC Oțelul Galați players